Castilleja attenuata is a species of Indian paintbrush, known by the common names valley tassels and attenuate Indian paintbrush.

It is native to western North America from British Columbia, through California, to Baja California, where it grows in grasslands and open woodland habitats.

Description
Castilleja attenuata is an annual herb growing up to about 50 centimeters tall. The leaves are linear in shape and several centimeters long.

The inflorescence has three-lobed bracts with yellow or white tips. Between the bracts emerge fuzzy white flowers dotted with purple and yellow.

External links
Jepson Manual Treatment: Castilleja attenuata
Castilleja attenuata — U.C. Photo gallery

attenuata
Flora of Baja California
Flora of British Columbia
Flora of Arizona
Flora of California
Flora of Oregon
Flora of Washington (state)
Flora of the Cascade Range
Flora of the Klamath Mountains
Flora of the Sierra Nevada (United States)
Natural history of the California chaparral and woodlands
Natural history of the California Coast Ranges
Natural history of the Central Valley (California)
Natural history of the Channel Islands of California
Natural history of the Peninsular Ranges
Natural history of the San Francisco Bay Area
Natural history of the Transverse Ranges
Taxa named by Asa Gray
Plants described in 1857
Flora without expected TNC conservation status